The Beach Boys with the Royal Philharmonic Orchestra is a 2018 album of remixed Beach Boys recordings with new orchestral arrangements performed by the Royal Philharmonic Orchestra. It was produced by Nick Patrick and Don Reedman, who conducted similar projects for Roy Orbison and Elvis Presley.

Promotion
Members Al Jardine, Bruce Johnston, David Marks, Mike Love, and Brian Wilson reunited for a question and answer session with Rob Reiner on July 30, 2018 to promote the album; it was the first time since The 50th Reunion Tour that they appeared together in public.

Reception
Stephen Thomas Erlewine of AllMusic wrote that the songs "either seem weighed down by an orchestra... or the strings seem extraneous", summing it up as an "exercise in mawkish nostalgia".

The album topped the Billboard Classical Crossover Albums and Top Classical Albums charts, selling 5,000 copies in its first week.

Track listing
"California Suite" (Sally Herbert) – 1:32
"California Girls" (Mike Love, Brian Wilson) – 2:45	
"Wouldn't It Be Nice" (Tony Asher, Love, Wilson) – 3:13
"Fun, Fun, Fun" (Love, Wilson) – 2:23
"Don't Worry Baby" (Roger Christian, Wilson) – 2:50
"God Only Knows" (Asher, Wilson) – 3:12
"Sloop John B" (traditional) – 3:43
"Heroes and Villains" (Van Dyke Parks, Wilson) – 4:07
"Disney Girls" (Bruce Johnston) – 4:36
"Here Today" (Asher, Wilson) – 3:07
"In My Room" (Gary Usher, Wilson) – 2:32
"Kokomo" (Love, Scott McKenzie, Terry Melcher, John Phillips) – 3:50
"The Warmth of the Sun" (Love, Wilson) – 3:15
"Darlin'" (Love, Wilson) – 2:18 	
"Help Me, Rhonda" (Love, Wilson) – 3:00 	
"You Still Believe in Me" (Asher, Wilson) – 3:11 	
"Good Vibrations" (Love, Wilson) – 4:20

Personnel
Adapted from AllMusic.

The Beach Boys (original recordings)
Al Jardine – vocals, guitar, bass guitar
Bruce Johnston – vocals, finger snaps, mandolin, Moog bass, piano
Mike Love – vocal harmony, vocals
David Marks – rhythm guitar
Brian Wilson – vocals, harpsichord, organ, percussion, piano, tack piano
Carl Wilson – vocals, guitar, rhythm guitar, percussion, ukulele
Dennis Wilson – vocals, drums, organ, percussion

Session musicians (original recordings)

Hal Blaine – drums, horn, percussion, piano, sleigh bells
Harold Billings – Horn
Ron Brown – Guitar (Bass)
Glen Campbell – Guitar
Ed Carter – Guitar
Al Casey – Guitar
Roy Caton – Trumpet
Chili Charles – Percussion
Vince Charles – Drums (Steel)
Rod Clark – Guitar (Bass)
Jerry Cole – Guitar
Gary Coleman – Percussion
Ry Cooder – Guitar (Acoustic), Mandolin, Slide Guitar
Mike Deasy – Guitar
Al DeLory – Harpsichord, Organ, Piano, Tack Piano
Dennis Dragon – Drums
Gene Estes – Percussion, Slide Whistle
Carl Fortina – Accordion
Jeffrey Foskett – Guitar (Rhythm)
Tommy Gerard – Accordion, Organ, Piano
Jim Gordon – Drums, Percussion
Carol Kaye – Guitar, Guitar (Bass), Guitar (Rhythm)
Terry Melcher – Producer, Synthesizer Harp, Tambourine
Virgil Evans – Horn
Bill Green – Clarinet, Flute, Saxophone
Leonard Hartman – Clarinet, Clarinet (Bass)
Jim Horn – Clarinet, Flute, Piccolo
George Hyde – French Horn
Plas Johnson – Clarinet, Piccolo, Sax (Tenor), Saxophone
Jim Keltner – Drums, Percussion
Barney Kessel – Guitar, Ukulele
Larry Knechtel – Harpsichord, Keyboards, Organ, Tack Piano
Maureen Love – Harp
Leonard Malarsky – Violin
Frank Marocco – Accordion
Gail Martin – Trombone (Bass)
Nick Martinis – Drums
Michael Melvoin – Piano
Tony Mercury – Tambourine
Jay Migliori – Clarinet, Clarinet (Bass), Flute, Sax (Baritone), Saxophone
Ollie Mitchell – Horn
Tommy Morgan – Harmonica
Buell Neidlinger – Bass (Upright)
Jack Nimitz – Sax (Baritone), Sax (Bass), Saxophone
Van Dyke Parks – Accordion, Composer, Tack Piano
John Parricelli – Guitar
Nick Patrick – Producer
Steve Pearce – Bas Dessus, Bass
Joel Peskin – Saxophone
Bill Pitman – Guitar, Guitar (Bass)
Ray Pohlman – Guitar (Bass)
Don Randi – Harpsichord, Keyboards, Piano, Tack Piano
Emil Richards – Vibraphone
Lyle Ritz – Bass (Upright), Guitar (Bass)
Howard Roberts – Guitar, Ukulele
Alan Robinson – French Horn
Leon Russell – Piano
Ralph Salmins – Drums
Billy Strange – Guitar, Tambourine
Ernie Tack – Trombone (Bass)
Paul Tanner – Theremin
Darrel Terwilliger – Viola
Julius Wechter – Bells, Percussion, Timpani
Arthur Wright – Guitar (Bass)

References

External links

2018 remix albums
Capitol Records remix albums
Collaborative albums
Orchestral pop albums
Royal Philharmonic Orchestra albums
The Beach Boys remix albums
Albums produced by Nick Patrick (record producer)